Changesite—(Y), with the chemical formula (Ca8Y)□Fe2+(PO4)7, is a mineral found forming colorless transparent columnar crystals in basalt particles on the Moon. Changesite—(Y) is a member of the merrillite group of phosphate minerals.

History
Changesite—(Y) is named after Chang'e, the Moon goddess in Chinese mythology. The Chinese Lunar Exploration Program's fifth lunar exploration mission, Chang'e 5, is China's first sample-return mission to the Moon. China National Space Administration and China Atomic Energy Authority jointly announced in Beijing on September 9, 2022, that the new mineral, Changesite—(Y), was found by scientists at the Beijing Research Institute of Uranium Geology from lunar surface samples returned by the country's Chang'e 5 robotic mission and has been approved by the International Mineralogical Association and its Commission on New Minerals, Nomenclature and Classification.

References 

Lunar samples
Lunar science
Phosphate minerals
Calcium minerals
Yttrium minerals
Iron(II) minerals